Gropello Cairoli is a comune (municipality) in the Province of Pavia in the Italian region Lombardy, located about 35 km southwest of Milan and about 15 km west of Pavia. As of 31 December 2010, it had a population of 4,602 and an area of 26.1 km².

Gropello Cairoli borders the following municipalities: Dorno, Garlasco, Villanova d'Ardenghi, Zerbolò, Zinasco.

Demographic evolution

References

Cities and towns in Lombardy